Fortunato Frezza (born 6 February 1942) is an Italian prelate of the Catholic Church who devoted his career to Biblical scholarship and teaching. He has been a canon of St. Peter's Basilica since 2013.

Pope Francis made him a cardinal on 27 August 2022.

Biography
Fortunato Frezza was born in the Montecalvello neighborhood of Viterbo on 6 February 1942. He studied at the minor seminary of Bagnoregio and the major seminary of Viterbo. On 28 June 1966 he was ordained a priest of the Diocese of Bagnoregio by Bishop Luigi Rosa of Bagnoregio. He obtained a licentiate in theology from the Pontifical Gregorian University in 1967 and a degree in sacred scripture from the Pontifical Biblical Institute in Rome in 1977 with a thesis on the book of the prophet Micah.

From 1971 to 1984 he was parish priest of Sipicciano.

In 1983 he joined the staff of the General Secretariat of the Synod of Bishops and on 23 June 1997 he was named its under-secretary by Pope John Paul II. On 13 December 2011 Pope Benedict XVI confirmed his appointment as under-secretary until his 72nd birthday.

In September 2013, Pope Francis appointed him a canon of St. Peter's Basilica and he was invested on 29 September; in 2022 he became Camerlengo of the Chapter of St. Peter in the Vatican. He has also held chaplaincies for Directorate of Health and Hygiene in the Vatican, for various monasteries of nuns, and for the football team A.S. Roma. He has authored numerous scholarly articles, especially in Biblical studies.

He has been Master of Ceremonies and Spiritual Assistant of the Order of the Holy Sepulchre since 2015.

He received his episcopal consecration on 23 July 2022 from Cardinal Mauro Gambetti, becoming titular archbishop of Treba.

On 27 August 2022, Pope Francis made him a cardinal deacon, assigning him the deaconry Santa Maria in Via Lata.

See also
 Cardinals created by Pope Francis

References

External links
 

1942 births
Living people
People from Viterbo
Pontifical Gregorian University alumni
Pontifical Biblical Institute alumni
Biblical scholars
Grand Masters of the Order of the Holy Sepulchre
21st-century Italian cardinals
Bishops appointed by Pope Francis